The IQ-quarter is a mixed-use complex composed of two skyscrapers and a high-rise located on plot 11 in the Moscow International Business Center (MIBC) in Moscow, Russia with a total area of . The skyscrapers are named Towers 1 and 2, with the latter being the tallest, and the high-rise just known as the IQ-quarter hotel or Tower 3. Construction of the complex began in 2008 and finished in 2016.

Both buildings serve as offices.

History 
Dutch company Citer Invest BV decided to invest in plot 11 of the MIBC back in 2003. Using 1,137 hectares, the company planned to build two office towers and a 4 star hotel with 390 rooms. The transport terminal was to be connected to Sheremetyevo International Airport, Vnukovo International Airport, the Moscow Metro, and ground transportation through the Third Ring Road. Construction of the complex started in 2008 and was planned to be completed in 2011.

In August 2008, the developer agreed with VTB Bank on project lending, but because of the Great Recession, the bank was unable to provide financing. As a result, construction was postponed in the first quarter of 2009. By this time, it was possible to erect only a wall in the ground and a pile foundation. Almost a year later, the company managed to raise $355 million with the help of Belgian financial institutions under the contracts issued by VTB. In November 2009, the developer expected that the complex would open in 2013.

In April 2011, the Russian construction company Hals-Development bought 50% plus one share of the project investor.

On 11 December 2014, the art piece Eye of Sauron was planned to be installed roof of the complex to go along with the Russian premiere of the film The Hobbit: The Battle of the Five Armies. This triggered an angry response by representatives of the Russian Orthodox Church.

The complex finished construction in 2016. The transaction value was estimated to be from 11.5 to 12 billion rubles.

See also 

 List of tallest buildings in Moscow
 List of tallest buildings in Russia
 List of tallest buildings in Europe
 List of tallest structures in the former Soviet Union

References

External links
 

Moscow International Business Center
Skyscrapers in Moscow
Twisted buildings and structures